The Ambarri were a Gallic people dwelling in the modern Ain department during the Iron Age and the Roman period.

Name 
They are mentioned as Ambarri and Ambarros by Caesar (mid-1st c. BC), and as Ambarros by Livy (late-1st c. BC),

The Gaulish ethnonym Ambarri could mean 'on both sides of the Saône river', stemming from the Gaulish suffix amb- ('around') attached to the pre-Celtic name of the Saône river, Arar. It has also been interpreted as a contraction of Ambi-barii ('the very-angry'), formed with the intensifying Gaulish suffix ambi- attached to bar(i)o- ('wrath, fury, passion'; cf. Welsh am-far 'mad rage', Old Irish barae 'fury, anger').

The cities of Ambérieu-en-Bugey, attested ca. 853 as Ambariacus (Ambayreu in 1240), Ambérieux-en-Dombes, attested in 501 as Ambariaco (Ambaireu in 1226), and Ambérieux, attested in 892 as Ambariacum, are named after the Gallic tribe. They originally derive from a form Ambarria attached to the suffix -acos.

Geography 
The Ambarri occupied a tract in the valley of the Rhône, probably in the angle between the Saône and the Rhône; and their neighbors on the east were the Allobroges. They are mentioned by Livy (v. 34) with the Aedui among those Galli who were said to have crossed the Alps into Italy in the time of Tarquinius Priscus. They are not mentioned among the clientes of the Aedui. (B. G. vii. 75.)

History 
According to Roman historian Titus Livius, the Ambarri joined Bellovesus' legendary migrations ca. 600 BC towards Italy:

Julius Caesar calls them close allies and kinsmen of the Aedui:

They are also mentioned by Caesar along the Aedui and the Allobroges:

References

Bibliography 

 
 

 
Gauls
Tribes of pre-Roman Gaul
Tribes involved in the Gallic Wars
Historical Celtic peoples
Ain